Basselinia vestita is a species of flowering plant in the family Arecaceae. It is found only in New Caledonia.

References

vestita
Endemic flora of New Caledonia
Vulnerable plants
Taxonomy articles created by Polbot